Conostomum is a genus of mosses belonging to the family Bartramiaceae.

Species:
 Conostomum cleistocarpum Herzog 
 Conostomum crassinervium P. de la Varde 
 Conostomum tetragonum (Hedw.) Lindb.

References

Bartramiales
Moss genera